Nataliya Nikolaychyk is a visually impaired Ukrainian Paralympic judoka. She represented Ukraine at the 2012 Summer Paralympics held in London, United Kingdom and she won one of the bronze medals in the women's 52 kg event.

At the 2015 IBSA European Judo Championships held in Odivelas, Portugal, she won the gold medal in the women's 52 kg event.

At the 2015 European Games held in Baku, Azerbaijan, she won one of the bronze medals in the women's blind 57 kg event.

References

External links 
 

Living people
Year of birth missing (living people)
Place of birth missing (living people)
Ukrainian female judoka
Judoka at the 2012 Summer Paralympics
Judoka at the 2020 Summer Paralympics
Medalists at the 2012 Summer Paralympics
Medalists at the 2020 Summer Paralympics
Paralympic bronze medalists for Ukraine
Paralympic medalists in judo
Paralympic judoka of Ukraine
European Games medalists in judo
European Games bronze medalists for Ukraine
21st-century Ukrainian women